R. Aravindraj is an Indian film director and screenwriter who has worked on Tamil films. He rose to fame after making the thriller film Oomai Vizhigal (1986) featuring Vijayakanth and has continued to make films in a similar genre.

Career
Aravindraj rose to fame after making the crime thriller film Oomai Vizhigal (1986) featuring Vijayakanth and Arun Pandian, which focused on a journalist making an investigation into the case of missing girls. The film became a trend-setter, with several film makers, including Aravindraj himself, choosing to make films of a similar genre. He often collaborated in ventures with writer Aabavanan, Vijayakanth and Arun Pandian throughout the late 1980s and early 1990s. Following the failure of Musthaffaa (1996), Aravindraj was forced to cancel another project titled News starring Ramki and Vijayashanti before going on a sabbatical. In 2001, he agreed terms with producer Ibrahim Rowther to make a film titled Pesum Vizhigal with Jaivijay, the son of actor Jaishankar, but the producer's financial troubles meant that the film was shelved.

He later moved on to make a television serial titled Soolam, which ran for two years, and also appeared as an actor in a few serials. He attempted to make a comeback to films through a venture titled Ayuthapadai, but the film did not have a theatrical release while another project titled Pesum Vizhigal failed to proceed after the launch. Subsequently, in 2010, he went on to make a political thriller titled Irandu Mugam starring Sathyaraj and Karan. Aravindraj also acted in the film, which had a low-key release and performed below average at the box office. In 2013, he revealed that he had finished work on a film titled Kavithai, which was shot in a single room featuring a single actress. The only role in the film was portrayed by Aravindraj's daughter Mahakeerthi, but the film remains unreleased.

Filmography

Director

Actor
Films
Innoruvan (2009)
Adhe Kangal (2017)

Television

References

External links

Living people
20th-century Indian film directors
Tamil film directors
Male actors in Tamil cinema
Year of birth missing (living people)